Hurdegaryp is a village in the northern part of the Netherlands, in the municipality of Tytsjerksteradiel. Its history dates back to at least the 13th century. It had a population of around 4,788 in January 2017.

In Dutch the village is called Hardegarijp, Hurdegaryp is its West Frisian and official name.

History 
The village was first mentioned in 1401 as Herdegaryp. The etymology is unclear. Originally the centre of the village was located further south. In 1830, the road to Leeuwarden was built. The Hurdegaryp railway station followed in 1866, and the centre of the village moved towards to the road and station.

The Dutch Reformed church was built in 1711 and has a wooden tower. It was a replacement for a 13th century church. Up to 1829, the Grovestins, a fortified tower was located to the south of the village.

Hurdegaryp was home to 624 people in 1840. From the 1960s onwards, it became a suburb of Leeuwarden. In 2017, five tiny houses measuring 3 by 9 metres were built in Hurdegaryp as affordable houses at €50,000.- It was an initiative of a starting real estate agent who himself could not afford to exchange his rented student room with a house. They were immediately sold.

Transportation
 Hurdegaryp railway station

Gallery

See also
 Fierljeppen

References

Tytsjerksteradiel
Populated places in Friesland